Driss Benzekri may refer to:
Driss Benzekri (activist) (1950–2007), Moroccan political and human rights activist
Driss Benzekri (footballer) (born 1970), retired Moroccan football goalkeeper